VG Pocket is a series of handheld dedicated game consoles built by JungleTac and sold by Performance Designed Products LLC. The VG Pocket model was the first console of its type to have a 2" backlit color LCD screen.

Description

The consoles have built-in games, the number of which varies with each model and many are clones and hacks of old Nintendo Entertainment System and arcade games. The devices also have a TV-out port with composite video and audio streaming through a non-standard stereo mini headset jack.

In 2008, the Caplet and Tablet models were also finalists in the International Design Excellence Awards; they were designed by Stuart Karten Design, a Los Angeles-based industrial design firm.

Versions 
There are five VG Pocket models available:
 VG Pocket Mini: 30 built-in games and a 1.5" screen.
 VG Pocket 50: 50 built-in games and a 2" screen.
 VG Pocket Max: 75 built-in games and a 2.5" screen.
 VG Pocket Caplet: 50 games, including licensed versions of Space Invaders, Bust-a-Move, and BurgerTime.
 VG Pocket Tablet: 25 games, including a licensed version of Frogger.

VG Pocket Max 
The VG Pocket Max is a handheld dedicated console distributed by Performance Designed Products. The system contains 75 games, which are mostly modified NES games. It has a 2.5" backlit color LCD screen, four buttons (plus a reset and a power button), a directional pad, volume control, a single speaker, a headphone jack, and a TV-out port.

In the UK a handheld was made called the Gamespower 50. The Gamespower 50 contained almost all the games (with names changed, such as Bird Droppings retitled as Birdies Nest) and looked exactly the same, except with different color. A plug and play version was made by Dream Gear, being essentially the same as the Gamespower 50. The plug n' play looks like a Dreamcast controller, but internally there is not much of a resemblance. This version is more focused on racing games, and only has 30 to 40 games in it. Unlike the VG Pocket Max, both the Gamespower 50 and the plug n' play version lack a selection menu.

Games 

Action
 Balloon Catcher
 Get It Right
 Jump
 Leap
 Night Monster
 Penguin Island
 Quick Match
 Road Works
 Sea Voyage
 Smash Ball
 Worm Catcher

Racing
 Autobahn
 Bandit Racer
 Bridge Driver
 Freeway
 Motor Rally
 Off-Roader
 Race and Ram
 Road Ace
 Road Race
 Road Rally
 Street Bike Racing
 Trucker
 World Racing

Shooting
 Air War
 Earth's Starfighter
 Mutant Hunt
 Quick Shot
 Sky Fighter
 Starcraft Attack

Sports
 Boat Racer
 Bulls-Eye
 Free Throws
 Knockem Down
 Rackets
 Surfs UP
 Target Shop

Wits
 Bird Craze
 Bird Droppings
 Bounce
 Cutterfly Catch
 Cats and Dogs
 Chuck Holes
 Dragon's Tail
 Drop and Stock
 Egg Catcher
 Fire Fight
 Flying Fish
 Fungi
 Fun Moves
 Globs
 Go Ball
 Go Bang
 Grow and Mow
 Jewel Master (Magic Jewelry hack)
 Marble Max
 Matching Dimonds
 Paddle Ball
 Paint Master (Brush Roller hack)
 Patch'n Go
 Pipelines
 Pool Pro
 Pop the Lop
 Puzzle Box
 Ricochet
 Risk It
 River Racing
 Sea Destroyer
 Sea World
 Sky Mission
 Smart Monkey
 Spin Ball
 Table Ball
 Tile Tizzel
 Wake the Baby

VG Pocket Caplet 

The VG Pocket Caplet is a dedicated console created by Performance Designed Products. Its graphics are considered an improvement over those of the earlier models of the VG Pocket, with a very bright 2.5" backlit 320×240 TFT display (the package claims its resolution is 960×240, counting the RGB triads to make 3× the number of pixels). It is a 16-bit system that appears to utilize some form of arcade emulation, since the majority of its games are either direct ports or clones of arcade games. The unit has the capability of being displayed on any TV set with the purchase of a separate "starter kit" that includes a storage carrying case and special AV cables unique to the system. There are no save features for high scores or game progress. Caplet comes in four colors: blue, silver, red, orange; and is powered by 3 AAA batteries.

Early versions of the Caplet contain 35 games, with the current version having 50. Both units have the same outward appearance. The packaging of the unit is the only way to identify how many games are on the system without turning on the unit. The unit initially retailed for $40.

Games 

 Space Invaders (licensed Taito port)
 Bust-A-Move (another licensed Taito port)
 BurgerTime (licensed Data East port)
 Sudoku Quiz (something of a misnomer, as there is no quiz included)
 Boxboy (Sokoban clone)
 Adventures of Waldog (platform game)
 Deep Storm (taken from Psikyo's Space Bomber; 3D shooter like Star Fox)
 Bubble Wubble (Tetris clone)
 Final Escape (Pengo clone)
 Wolfy's Quest
 Legendary Hero (Don Doko Don clone)
 Craig the Caterpillar (Susume!! Mile Smile clone)
 Crystal Cavern (Magical Drop clone)
 Final Round Tennis!
 Magic Jelly (nothing like Bomberman, the player's goal is to use bombs to change the color of every block on the screen, without leaping to death.)
 Blazebusters (Arkanoid/Breakout clone)
 Rotating Puzzle (animated slide puzzle game)
 Underwater Pinball (Arkanoid/Breakout clone)
 Bubble Blaster (Zuma clone)
 Greedy Grabber
 Puzzle Chance
 Victory Road (Frogger clone)
 Jet Racing (Pole Position clone)
 Yummy and Tasty (Gussun Oyoyo clone)
 Code Name: Plumber (platform game)
 Hanoi Tower
 Leapfrog
 Win or Lose
 Pop Goes the Ball! (Pang clone)
 Kart Racer X (overhead racer)
 Battle Blocks II (another Arkanoid/Breakout clone)
 Switch and Mix (Lights out clone)
 Survival Challenge
 Go Back Home!
 Motojet Mania (overhead racer)
 Tiger Rescue (vertical scrolling shooter similar to Aero Fighters)
 Billiards Master
 Mr. Onion
 Wacky Racing (another Pole Position clone)
 Tennis Caddie Blaze of Glory (horizontal scrolling shooter)
 Underwater Memory Crane Maniac Go Bang Jewel Master 2 Smashing Ladybugs Submarine Slot Machine (casino game)
 Video Poker (casino game)
 Black Jack (casino game)

 VG Pocket Tablet 

The VG Pocket Tablet is a portable handheld video gaming system created by PDP in 2006. The console is self-contained, as there is no cartridge slot, but rather it is pre-loaded with 25 games. It initially sold for $29.99. It has a round tablet-shaped design in four colors: orange, green, red, and white; a very bright 2” backlit 640×240 TFT display; and is powered by 3 AAA batteries. The unit has a port that allows connectivity to television via standard analog RCA port. The cable was available with the purchase of a separate “starter kit” that includes a storage carrying case and AV hookup cables, but is not an uncommon cable, also used for portable DVD players.
Games included are remakes or clones of classic arcade and 8-bit console games. Many reviewers have commented on the surprising quality of the console's screen.

 Games 

 Frogger (licensed Konami classic)
 Stellar Attack Motocross Racer Billiards Sudoku Quiz Mutant Hunt Funny Fungi Leaper the Frog Lord of the Jewels Off-Roader Risk It! Battle Blocks Construction Jack Memory Matching Track Star River Quest Star Alley Pinball Labyrinth Vitamania Mr. Onion Delivery Express Birds of Prey Whack the Critter Stuntman Daredevil Delta Fighter''

See also 
First generation of video game consoles
Handheld electronic game
List of dedicated consoles
List of first generation home video game consoles
List of retro style video game consoles
Nintendo Entertainment System hardware clone
Video game console
 Home video game console
 Handheld game console
 Microconsole

References 

Dedicated consoles
Handheld game consoles